Guo Shanshan (born 9 August 1996) is an inactive Chinese tennis player.

She has a career-high singles ranking of world No. 479, achieved on 6 March 2017. She also has a career-high WTA doubles ranking of 476, set on 3 July 2017.

Guo made her WTA Tour main-draw debut at the 2017 Wuhan Open in the doubles draw partnering Ye Qiuyu.

ITF Circuit finals

Singles: 1 (1–0)

Doubles: 3 (2–1)

External links
 
 

1996 births
Living people
Chinese female tennis players
Tennis players from Wuhan
21st-century Chinese women